The 2015 Henrico County Commonwealth's Attorney election was held on November 3, 2015, to elect the Commonwealth's Attorney of Henrico County, Virginia, concurrently with elections to the Senate of Virginia and Virginia House of Delegates. Incumbent Democratic Commonwealth's Attorney Shannon Taylor won reelection to a second term against Republican nominee Tony Pham by a wide margin.

Background 
Attorney Shannon Taylor, who had been serving as the incumbent Commonwealth's Attorney having won the previous election against Matthew Geary and Bill Janis, announced her campaign for reelection. On February 23, 2015, Pham announced his candidacy for the Henrico County Commonwealth's Attorney, being the fourth and last Republican to do so.

Republican primary 
The Republican primary took place in June 2015 with three candidates, as Tom Shaia had withdrawn from the race. Jeffrey Lee Everhart was predicted to win the primary, leading the primary by a small margin between him and Pham, but after a faulty report from the Pinchbeck Precinct was fixed, Pham lead the primary by 67 points. Pham was later declared the Republican nominee.

Candidates 
Jeffrey Lee Everhart, lawyer
Shannon Dillon, attorney
Tony Pham, prosecutor (2000–2008)

Withdrew 
Tom Shaia, lawyer

Endorsements

Results

Democratic primary 
Shannon Taylor, incumbent Commonwealth's Attorney

Results

References 

2015 Virginia elections